Dooring is the act of opening a motor vehicle door into the path of another road user. Dooring can happen when a driver has parked or stopped to exit their vehicle, or when passengers egress from cars, taxis and rideshares into the path of a cyclist in an adjacent travel lane. The width of the door zone in which this can happen varies, depending upon the model of car one is passing. The zone can be almost zero for a vehicle with sliding or gull-wing doors or much larger for a truck. In many cities across the globe, doorings are among the most common and injurious bike-vehicle incidents. Any passing vehicle may also strike and damage a negligently opened or left open door, or injure or kill the exiting motorist or passenger.

Doorings can be avoided if the driver checks their side mirror before opening the door, or performs a shoulder check. Use of the Dutch Reach (or "far hand method") for vehicle egress has been advised to prevent doorings, as it combines both measures. As bicyclists cannot rely on motor vehicle occupants to use required caution on exiting, bicyclists are advised to avoid the door zone of stopped or parked vehicles.

The term is also applied when such sudden door opening causes the oncoming rider to swerve to avoid collision (with or without loss of control), resulting in a crash or secondary collision with another oncoming vehicle or another vehicle that is directly next to the cyclist. The term also applies when a door is negligently left open, unduly blocking a travel lane.

Legal issues

Many countries are aligned with the Vienna convention which states: "It shall be prohibited to open the door of a vehicle, to leave it open, or to alight from the vehicle without having made sure that to do so cannot endanger other road-users." (Article 24 — Opening of doors).

Most areas have laws that require car users to check for all oncoming traffic including cyclists before opening the door of their vehicle. Some jurisdictions also consider it a traffic code violation if vehicle doors are unnecessarily left open and thus continue to obstruct an adjacent travel lane.

Despite such laws,  serious injuries and deaths continue to be caused by occupants opening doors or by bicycle riders riding in the door zone. A 2015 British survey found that 35% of drivers self-reported that they did not check for traffic before opening their vehicle's door to exit.

The problem lies with avoiding this  zone, which should be part of the parking zone, when there is a bike lane or the perception by law enforcement or motorists that one should be riding their bike out of the travel lane to not impede faster motorized traffic. In most jurisdictions, a cyclist is considered a driver/operator of a vehicle afforded the same rights as the driver of a motor vehicle; however, in some jurisdictions cyclists are further restricted by laws such as "ride as far right [or left] as practicable." From a cyclist's point of view, "practicable" includes safety, and safety is noted in many of these laws through exceptions; however, many law enforcement, judges, motoring public and even cyclists stop reading at "as far right."

Avoidance and prevention
Dooring prevention has proven a difficult problem as incidents can occur wherever hinged vehicle doors are carelessly opened and suddenly obstruct travel lanes or sidewalks. Surveys of driver behavior upon egress, in the United Kingdom and the state of Florida, USA, found that 1/3rd (33%) and 3/5th's (60%) of drivers respectively did not check for oncoming road users before opening.

Cyclists are advised to avoid door zones and exercise great caution if in range of open doors from either side when in traffic. Motorists and passengers are advised to exercise heightened caution and vigilance before and during entry or egress from their vehicle. Passengers are advised to exit curb-side only, and never when vehicles are paused in a travel lane.

Street planners are encouraged to avoid placing bike lanes in door zones, and to implement instead buffered, separated and/or protected bike lanes and tracks, or shared lane markings. Motor vehicle bureaus and departments of transportation are advised not to restrict vulnerable road users into door zone bike lanes by force of traffic code.

Motor vehicle engineers and manufacturers are deploying new technologies to warn or prevent vehicle occupants from exiting in the presence of oncoming traffic. Auxiliary side view mirrors are now available which fit on B-pillar (car) to assist rear-seated passengers preparing to exit.

Road safety advocates also call for greater enforcement, fines and penalties, while insurance companies and personal injury attorneys apply sanctions after the fact in the form of increased premiums and liability lawsuits.

Improved training in road sharing by motorists with vulnerable road users is recommended for all road users, done by means of upgraded driver licensing and education standards, curriculum and testing, and public education and behavior change campaigns to improve road safety conduct.

Education
Because it is rarely possible to see and react safely to a suddenly opening door, traffic cycling educational programs teach cyclists to ride in the safe zone or travel lane well outside the door zone as measured from the tip of the handlebars.

As street planners often lay out painted bike lanes in the door zone, many bicycle safety advocates advise cyclists to maintain a safe distance from car doors nonetheless and disregard such markings to do so. However riding on the margin of the bike lane places a cyclist in increased proximity to overtaking vehicles and also at risk of being squeezed closer into the doorzone. Other advocates therefore instruct bicyclists to take control of the full travel lane and adopt "vehicular cycling", to avoid dooring, considering this to be the safest position overall.

Also to avoid doorings, bicyclists are advised to exercise vigilance, scan for the presence or likelihood of an occupied parked or stopped vehicle. Risk is increased especially in areas and at times of high parking turnover, on main arteries, during morning and evening commutes, and in retail, restaurant and entertainment districts with parallel parking. Bicyclists are also advised to assure their visibility to motorists & in mirrors both day and night by the use of bright and reflective clothing, vests, reflectors and front lights. Marked caution, slow speed and preparedness to brake when in the door zone are also counselled.

Dutch Reach

Motorists and passengers – both front and rear – may be able to make dooring less likely by practising the "Dutch Reach"  – opening the car door by reaching across the body with the more distant hand which promotes a shoulder check – out and back – to scan for cyclists and other oncoming traffic.

Reaching across turns one's upper body and head outward. It encourages drivers and front passengers to use the side wing mirror, look out to the side and then over one's shoulder to scan for traffic before opening. Once the door is partly opened, as one leans out one's over-the-shoulder view is now clear, no longer limited by side pillar or door frame. Reaching across helps to curb wide, sudden opening as a further safeguard against dooring.

Even as the maneuver is becoming known elsewhere as the "Dutch Reach", in the Netherlands driving instructors and driving school companies refer to it by description and not by a name. The far hand move is not literally specified by Dutch traffic code to pass the safe parking section of the road test. Rather, Dutch regulations for licensing set two standards to ensure safe exiting of vehicles to protect vulnerable road users (VRUs), viz:  Articles 4e and 6a. 
As fewer than half of Dutch license applicants pass the examination on first attempt, some but not all Dutch driving instructors and texts for the theory examination teach the far hand maneuver as most assured to demonstrate safe exiting on both the written and road tests.

The reach method is likely less practiced by Dutch motorists today than in the 1960s–1980s when Dutch road fatalities numbered in the thousands and prompted the Stop the Kindermoord protest movement to end the carnage. Anecdotal reports date the 'reach across' practice to that era. But public awareness of the method in the Netherlands extends at least back to 1961. 
Since then bicycling in the Netherlands is much safer. Innovative and extensive infrastructure improvements, separate and protected cycle tracks, strict driver education and testing, popular use of bicycles for daily transport and dedication to road safety, all contributed to its dramatic decline in road injuries and fatalities. Yet dooring injuries and even fatalities in the Netherlands still occur, and the far hand method is still taught, though public awareness of it and its practice in the Netherlands has waned.

As noted above, the far hand technique does not have a Dutch name, but in 2016 an American physician in Cambridge, Massachusetts, USA, coined the term to promote the Dutch method which was little known in the United States. 
The “Dutch Reach” coinage reflects that the method was common to the Netherlands before being 'imported' to the U.S. It was described as a Dutch road safety measure in the American mainstream press in 2011 by the New York Times  and the Boston Globe in 2013.

The method can be traced beyond northern Europe starting in the 2010s. From 2011 to 2016 several bicycle advocacy organizations and road safety agencies in the United States, Canada and Australia added advisories or launched anti-dooring campaigns which included or featured the far hand countermeasure. In New Haven, CT it was variously called the "Amsterdam", "European cities’" or “reach-across” method (2013). In Fort Collins, CO it became the “Opposite Hand Trick” (2014). However the tip remained nameless in San Francisco, CA (2015);  Montreal (2014), and Vancouver (2016), Canada; New Zealand (2015); and Victoria, Australia (2012). In Australia two slogans have emerged to prompt the habit: "Lead with your left" [origin uncertain]; and "Always Cross Check", devised by a road safety organization. [Note: Drivers in left hand drive countries 'lead with left' to reach across.]

In early 2017 the Royal Society for the Prevention of Accidents (UK) endorsed the Dutch Reach as the recommended road safety practice to avoid dooring collisions. In 2019, the National Safety Council (U.S.) and American Automobile Association began including the far hand reach  in their respective defensive driving and novice driver course materials  and road safety programs. National, state and local bicycle and pedestrian advocacy organizations have played an important part in promoting the measure. These include: We Are Cycling UK; League of American Bicyclists; Bicycle Network (AUS); Cycling Action Network (NZ); New York Bicycle Coalition; Bicycle Friendly Driver Program of Fort Collins, CO; MassBike and Somerville Bicycle Committee.

Other governments are now adding the 'reach' to driver's manuals and education, taxi and for-hire ridesharing regulations, and road safety campaigns. Examples include: The United Kingdom, Commonwealth of Massachusetts, State of Illinois, State of Washington, State of Pennsylvania, South Australia, Washington D.C., 
City of London Corporation, Berlin, Germany, NYC Taxi & Limousine Commission, Cambridge, MA, USA, and Burbank, CA. In 2018, Addison Lee launched its own anti-dooring far hand reach campaign branding it 'the Addison Lean'. In April 2019 Lyft, a U.S. TNC implemented automatic wikt: in-app push notifications to prompt its drivers and clients in 22 U.S. cities to use the Dutch Reach when exiting. Uber followed one month later with a pilot Dutch Reach education program for its users & drivers in four North American cities. Some police departments, hospitals, motor vehicle insurance companies, transportation management companies and personal injury law firms have also begun promoting the method.

Until 2018, the scientific safety literature had been silent on the relative merits or flaws of near hand versus far hand egress from vehicles. However a human factors research paper Validating the Dutch Reach presented at the 7th International Cycling Safety Conference  in October 2018, found initial evidence for its safety advantage.  In 2019 British automaker Aston Martin introduced a reversed door latch lever  in its Vantage sports car whose ergonomic design strongly favors far-hand use for opening while making the near hand habit awkward.

Automated systems

Several automakers and automotive technology companies have introduced or are now developing advanced driver assistance systems (ADAS) to help prevent doorings. Technologies include use of external onboard cameras and sensors, seat buckles, or GPS data, computer recognition software etc. linked to sound or light signals or door operation to alert or warn drivers and/or cyclists, or forestall door opening.

At least one auto-parts supplier has developed an automatic detection system to prevent or warn the user before opening the car door if a bicycle is approaching.

However, the introduction of automatically folding side view mirrors may increase the risk of dooring should the mirrors retract before the occupants exit the vehicle.

Prevalence
 It is difficult to find statistics on the incidence of door zone fatalities, serious injuries, and collisions as the type of accident is often not recorded consistently from city to city. However, an analysis of Chicago bike crashes found that there were 344 reported dooring crashes reported in 2011, for a rate of 0.94 doorings per day. Doorings made up 19.7% of all reported bike crashes. The number of additional doorings that occurred without being reported is unknown. In 2016, San Francisco Municipal Transportation Agency reported that for the period 2012–2015, doorings of bicyclists constituted 16% of injurious or fatal bike-vehicle incidents in which the cyclist was likely not at fault. A 2015 study for the City of Vancouver, British Columbia found that doorings accounted for 15.2% of all bike collisions and was the foremost cause of bike-vehicle collision injuries which resulted in hospital emergency department treatment (22%) – not including additional injury incidents due to dooring avoidant swerve crashes requiring emergency treatment.

Collisions
In Toronto, "motorist opens door in path of cyclist" collisions were 11.9% of all reported car/bike collisions in 2003, however, is difficult to determine exactly how many bicycle accidents and serious injuries are attributed to dooring because the Ontario Ministry of Transportation does not classify dooring as a collision, and therefore these numbers are not regularly reported alongside other types of bicycle accidents. However, there are reports that in Toronto alone, dooring incidents increased by 58% in the three-year period between 2014 and 2016. Eight percent of serious injuries to cyclists in London in 2007 were caused by cyclists swerving to avoid opening car doors. In the Australian state of Victoria between 2006 and 2010, car door openings caused eight percent of serious injuries to cyclists.

Relative risk
Relative to other collisions such as getting rear ended, getting doored is less risky: "80.04% of those cyclists who were doored were injured, while 94.40% of those in non-dooring crashes were injured." Also, getting doored itself usually is not fatal; rather, most serious door-zone-related injuries are sustained by getting hit by a motor vehicle after colliding with or swerving to avoid the obstructing door. Thus, most dooring deaths and serious injuries occur in the travel lane and not in the door zone.

Fatalities
As with other dooring statistics, even fatalities are often under-reported as, for example, secondary collisions after door avoidant swerves may not be recognized by authorities, the media, witnesses or perpetrators as due to a dooring incident. Also, in some jurisdictions, dooring is not officially considered a motor vehicle collision if the vehicle is parked. Informal logs of dooring fatalities based on found media reports have been maintained on the internet. An annotated, international memorial spreadsheet with entries from 1987 to the present is currently maintained by an American cycling safety advocate.

In New York City, 3% (7 out of 225) of bicyclist fatalities in the ten-year period between 1996 and 2005 were from striking an open door or swerving to avoid one. In London three people were killed in car door opening incidents between 2010 and 2012. In two peer reviewed studies, 124 deaths in London during 1985–1992, 
and 142 deaths in New Zealand during 1973–1978, none of the fatalities occurred in door opening incidents. While there were 1112 collisions caused by opening doors in the Australian state of Victoria between 2000 and 2010, the first fatality occurred in March 2010.

Bike lanes and door zone incidents
In a comparison of Santa Barbara (without bike lanes) to Davis, California (with bike lanes), 8% of the car-bike collisions in Santa Barbara involved an opening door, whereas Davis had none.

See also
Outline of cycling
Cycling infrastructure
Shared lane marking

References

External links
 The "Door Zone" includes instructive diagrams.
 The Door Zone Project
 Door Zone Avoidance Preston Tyree, recently retired Education Director at League of American Bicyclists, teaching LCI (instructor) candidates how to teach about the door zone.
 Why You Should Avoid the Door Zone Video showing how bicyclists are thrown into traffic when they collide with an opening car door.
Dooring Fatalities A spreadsheet log of dooring deaths with details & media links maintained by John Brooking, USA.
 Dutch Reach Project An international project and website to promote the far-hand 'Dutch Reach' method to avoid doorings and related collisions caused by negligent motorist egress.
 Officials’ Dutch Reach Instruction Guide Detailed instructions & explanation of Dutch Reach method.
 Displays door lever design which favors far hand method (at 8m 12s).
 Dutch Reach Project Case Study, published by the Observatory for Public Sector Innovation, Organisation for Economic Co-operation & Development, April 2019. Describes & documents the international campaign to promote the far hand 'Dutch Reach' method for dooring avoidance and safe egress.

Vehicular cycling
Cycling safety
Car doors